Georgi Damyanov (born 21 September 1979 in Varna) is a Bulgarian footballer, who plays as a centre back. He captains A PFG side Svetkavitsa.

References

External links
 

Living people
1979 births
Bulgarian footballers
Association football defenders
PFC Spartak Varna players
PFC Svetkavitsa players
First Professional Football League (Bulgaria) players